H. Fred Clark (1937 – April 28, 2012) was an American veterinarian, medical scientist, and social activist. He served as a research professior of pediatrics at the University of Pennsylvania's Perelman School of Medicine and at the Children's Hospital of Philadelphia, as well as holding the position of adjunct professor at the Wistar Institute. He is recognized for his work with Paul Offit and Stanley Plotkin developing the rotavirus vaccine RotaTeq. For this work, Clark, Offit, and Plotkin received the Children's Hospital of Philadelphia's Gold Medal in 2006. He received a degree in veterinary medicine from Cornell University and a Ph.D. in microbiology and immunology from the University of Buffalo.

References

Further reading

1937 births
2012 deaths
Vaccinologists
Cornell University alumni
American pediatricians
American medical researchers
Perelman School of Medicine at the University of Pennsylvania faculty
University at Buffalo alumni